Swansea Market situated in the heart of Swansea city centre is the largest indoor market in Wales. The market is covered by a steel arched portal frame roof clad in steel and glass.  The current market was built in 1959-1960 by Percy Thomas.  Adjoining the market is the Quadrant Shopping Centre.

History
The current market building is the second market to be built at the site in 200 years.   There has been a covered market in Swansea since 1652, when a market was held in a building near the castle.  The previous market on this site had existed since 1894 and was destroyed during the Swansea Blitz in the Second World War.

The first dedicated market building was built in 1774 at the top of Wind Street. That consisted of a roof supported by pillars - it had no external walls.  A new market called the New Market opened in 1830 which was a walled structure with a roof lining the walls.  The interior market space was open to the elements.  The open walled structure was replaced with a new red brick building which opened on 22 June 1897.  The new building was entirely roofed and by December 1897, electric lighting had been introduced.  This building was hit during the Luftwaffe bombing raids in 1941 destroying the roof and the interior of the building.  During the rest of the 1940s and 1950s, the market was held as an outdoor market at site where the market building once stood.

The replacement market opened in 1961, celebrating its 50th anniversary in 2011.

Facilities
The market includes fruit and vegetable stalls, butchers, cafes, fast food, fishmongers and clothes stalls.  There are also a number of stalls selling local and continental delicacies, such as continental cheeses, Welsh laverbread, Penclawdd cockles, Gower Saltmarsh lamb and Welsh Black beef.

In 2013 the market roof was due for a £1 million modernisation consisting of new roofing sheets and lighting and possibly new solar power generating roofing panels.

References

External links
Swansea Market (official site)
SwanseaHeritage.net Swansea Market

Buildings and structures in Swansea
Retail markets in Wales
Shopping in Swansea
Buildings and structures completed in 1960
Food markets in the United Kingdom